Avenasterol, or Δ-7-Avenasterol is a natural, stigmastane-type sterol.

References

Sterols
Isopropyl compounds
Alkene derivatives